Blast is the debut solo album by the British musician Holly Johnson of Frankie Goes to Hollywood. It was released in 1989 and reached No. 1 in the UK Albums Chart and sold over 300,000 copies making it platinum. The album stayed on the charts for 17 weeks. The album features the hits "Love Train", "Americanos", "Atomic City" and "Heaven's Here". The album was re-released in November 2009 and again in November 2010.

In 2010, Johnson marked "Love Will Come" and "Heaven's Here" as his favourite tracks from the album. The album's title Blast came from the short-lived magazine of the early-20th century British Vorticist art movement.

In a 2014 interview with The Arts Desk, Johnson spoke of his reaction to the success of Blast following the stressful nature of his court case with record label ZTT:

Track listing

Original release
All tracks written by Johnson except "Atomic City" (Johnson, Dan Hartman).

 "Atomic City" – 6:15
 "Heaven's Here" – 4:16
 "Americanos" – 3:35
 "Deep in Love" – 3:58
 "S.U.C.C.E.S.S." – 3:31
 "Love Train" – 4:02
 "Got It Made" – 3:49
 "Love Will Come" – 4:28
 "Perfume" – 3:33
 "Feel Good" – 5:28

Blast (Expanded Edition) (2010)

Disc 1 - The Blast Album Remastered
 "Atomic City" – 6:14
 "Heaven's Here" – 4:18
 "Americanos" – 3:37
 "Deep in Love" – 4:00
 "S.U.C.C.E.S.S." – 3:33
 "Love Train" – 4:03
 "Got It Made" – 3:50
 "Love Will Come" – 4:29
 "Perfume" – 3:35
 "Feel Good" – 5:25

Disc 1 continued - B-Sides and Rarities
 "Murder in Paradise" (B-Side of "Love Train") – 6:25
 "Americanos" (Mambo Dub) (B-Side of "Americanos") – 4:14
 "Beat the System" (B-Side of "Atomic City") – 3:48
 "Hollelujah" (B-Side of "Heaven's Here"/From the album Hollelujah) – 4:08
 "Love Me Tender" – 3:09
 "Perfume" (Aromatherapy Mix) (From the album Hollelujah) – 5:58
 "Perfume" (Aromatherapy Instrumental Mix) (Previously unreleased) – 4:13

Disc 2 - The Blast Singles Remixed

Disc 3 - DVD - The Blast Promotional Videos
 "Love Train" (Promo Video)
 "Americanos" (Promo Video)
 "Atomic City" (Promo Video)
 "Heaven's Here" (Promo Video)
 "Atomic City" (Enviro-Mental 12" Mix) (Promo Video)

Personnel
Holly Johnson - vocals, synthesizer
Neil Taylor, Johnny Willett, Vini Reilly, Steve Byrd - guitar
Brian May - guitar solo on "Love Train"
Nick Bagnall, Andy Richards, Marius de Vries, Steve Howell - keyboards
Chris Whitten - drums
Danny Cummings, Luís Jardim - percussion
Chyna Gordon, Dee Lewis, Suddenly Denise, Stevie Lange, Lance Ellington, Mark Williamson, Vicky Brown - background vocals
Guy Barker, John Barclay, John Thirkell, Phil Todd, Stuart Brooks - brass

Chart performance

References

Holly Johnson albums
1989 debut albums
Albums produced by Stephen Hague
Albums produced by Dan Hartman
MCA Records albums